The Speed Cubers is a 2020 documentary on the lives of speedcubing champions Max Park and Feliks Zemdegs directed by Sue Kim.

Focus
The documentary's main focus is the rivalry and friendship between two of the fastest speedcubers in the world, Max Park and Feliks Zemdegs. Announced in June 2020, the film was directed by Sue Kim and premiered on July 29, 2020, on Netflix.

Venue featured
Some of the footage was shot at the World Cube Association's World Championships 2019 held in Melbourne, Australia.

Premise
The documentary captures the "extraordinary twists and turns in the journeys of Rubik's Cube-solving champions Max Park and Feliks Zemdegs."

Reception
 On February 9, 2021, the documentary was shortlisted in the Documentary Short Subject category of the 93rd Academy Awards. At the 5th Critics' Choice Documentary Awards, The Speed Cubers was nominated for Best Short Documentary. The film also received a nomination for the Peabody Award under the documentaries category.

References

External links

Official trailer

Netflix original documentary films
2020 films
2020 short documentary films
Autism in the arts
Rubik's Cube